Jewish Quarter may refer to:
Jewish quarter (diaspora), areas of many cities and towns traditionally inhabited by Jews
Jewish Quarter (Jerusalem), one of the four traditional quarters of the Old City of Jerusalem
Jewish Quarter, a popular name for Villa Muñoz, Montevideo

See also
Ghettos in Nazi-occupied Europe, ghettos established by the Nazis to confine the Jewish populations of Eastern European countries
Jewish ghettos in Europe, areas in which Jews were excluded from European society
Jewish Quarterly, UK literary and cultural magazine
Mellah, a walled Jewish quarter of a city in Morocco